Dimitris Siologas (alternate spellings: Dimitrios, Siologkas); (born April 28, 1994) is a Greek professional basketball player. He is 1.98 m tall. He can play at Forward positions.

Professional career
Siologas started his professional career with Iraklis Thessaloniki on a season loan from Mantoulidis. In 2016 he signed with Aries Trikala but was released on November 10 of the same year.

References

External links
Greek League Profile 
Eurobasket.com Profile
RealGM.com Profile

1994 births
Living people
Aries Trikala B.C. players
Greek men's basketball players
Greek Basket League players
Basketball players from Thessaloniki
Small forwards